Alun Mark Anderson (born North Wales, 27 May 1948) is a Welsh scientist and science journalist. He is best known as the editor in chief and publishing director of New Scientist from 1992 to 2005. He continues to act as a consultant for the magazine. In 2009 he published After the Ice:Life, Death, and Geopolitics in the New Arctic, about the effects of climate change on the wildlife and native peoples of the arctic region.

A 2003 interview at the University of Sussex is the likely inspiration for Richard Dawkins' famous quote "Science is interesting and if you don't agree you can fuck off".

References

External links

 Alun Mark Anderson profile at Debrett's

1948 births
Living people
Writers from London
Welsh scientists
Alumni of the University of Sussex
Alumni of the University of Edinburgh
20th-century Welsh scientists
21st-century Welsh scientists
20th-century British writers
21st-century British writers
New Scientist people